2007 Rugby World Cup – European qualification was a European Nations Cup competition that decided which European teams participated in the 2007 Rugby World Cup in France. The group stages counted towards both qualification and the European Nations Cup. Hosts France and other 2003 World Cup quarter finalists England, Ireland, Scotland and Wales qualified automatically.

Qualification process
There were three places available for European teams, and one place in the repechage. The teams were ranked according to their division in the European Nations Cup, taking into account the relegations and promotions at the end of the previous competition. Note that for the 2004/05 season Division 1 did not count towards World Cup qualification. The 2005/06 season decided which round (either 4 or 5) the teams entered. In the group rounds, there were three points awarded for a win, two for a draw, and one for a loss. There were no bonus points awarded.

Round 1
The eight teams from divisions 3B (apart from newly relegated from 3A Hungary) and 3C (apart from Azerbaijan and Armenia) played each other in four two-legged playoffs. The winners entered the next round.

Round 2
The four Round 1 winners, Hungary, and the fifteen teams from divisions 2A, 2B and 3A were drawn into four groups of five. They played each other once, with the best two teams qualifying for the next round. The third placed teams played in two two-legged playoffs to qualify for the next round.

Round 3
The four winners, four runners-up, and two play-off winners from Round 2 were drawn into two groups of five. The best team from each group played each other in a two legged playoff for a place in the next round.

Round 4
The bottom three teams from Division 1 2005/06 and the winner of the previous round played two two-legged playoffs to enter the next round.

Round 5
The winner of Round 4 Playoff 1, the third placed team from Division 1 2005/06 and Six Nations competitor Italy form Pool A. The winner of Round 4 Playoff 2 and the first and second placed teams from Division 1 2005/06 form Pool B. The top team from each pool qualified for the World Cup as Europe 1 and Europe 2. The second placed teams entered the next round.

Round 6
The two second placed teams from Round 5 played a two-legged playoff, with the winner qualifying for the World Cup as Europe 3. The loser entered the repechage as Europe 4.

Round 1
Andorra, Austria, Bulgaria and Lithuania qualified for round 2.

Andorra won 99–12 on aggregate

The first match was refereed by André Watson. He was called by the International Board, because in this way the first match of qualification the new edition of Rugby World Cup could be refereed by the same judge as the last match (the final) of the Rugby World Cup 2003. Watson had announced his retirement from international rugby only three months before after a match between Australia and Pacific Islands.

Austria won 41–17 on aggregate

Bulgaria won 92–6 on aggregate

Lithuania won 113–7 on aggregate

Round 2

Pool A
Spain and Croatia qualified for Round 3. Andorra entered the playoffs.

Match Schedule

Pool B
Germany and Moldova qualified for Round 3. Denmark entered the playoffs.

Match Schedule

Pool C
Belgium and the Netherlands qualified for Round 3. Sweden entered the playoffs.

Match Schedule

Pool D
Poland and Serbia and Montenegro qualified for round 3. Malta entered the playoffs.

Match Schedule

Playoffs
Andorra and Malta qualified for Round 3.

Malta win 31–30 on aggregate

Andorra won 40–34 on aggregate

Round 3

Pool A
Spain entered playoff.

Match Schedule

Pool B
Germany entered playoff.

Match Schedule

Playoff
Spain qualified for Round 4.

Spain win 42–28 on aggregate

European Nations Cup Division 1 2004/06
See European Nations Cup (rugby union)

Romania, Georgia, and Portugal qualified for Round 5. Russia, Czech Republic, and Ukraine qualified for Round 4.

Round 4 – September 2006
Spain and Russia qualified for Round 5.

Spain won 79–29 on aggregate

Russia won 62–28 on aggregate

Round 5 – October 2006

Pool A
Italy qualified for World Cup as Europe 1. Portugal entered Round 6.

Match Schedule

Pool B
Romania qualified for World Cup as Europe 2. Georgia entered Round 6.

Match Schedule

Round 6 – November 2006
Georgia qualified for World Cup as Europe 3. Portugal entered repechage as Europe 4.

Georgia won 28–14 on aggregate

References

External links
 World Cup website

2007
Europe
2004–05 in European rugby union
2005–06 in European rugby union